"Love Machine" is a 1975 single recorded by Motown group The Miracles, taken from their album City of Angels. The song was a #1 Pop smash on the Billboard Hot 100, and the biggest-selling hit single of The Miracles' career.  This single was one of two Billboard Hot 100 Top 20 hits recorded by The Miracles with Billy Griffin as lead vocalist; the other is 1973's "Do It Baby". Griffin had replaced Miracles founder Smokey Robinson as lead singer in 1972. The song features a growling vocal by Miracle Bobby Rogers, with group baritone Ronnie White repeating "yeah, baby" throughout the song.

Background
Engineered and mixed by Kevin Beamish, "Love Machine" was produced by Freddie Perren, a former member of The Corporation brain trust in charge of the early Jackson 5 hits. It was written by Billy Griffin and his Miracles group-mate, original Miracle Pete Moore, with whom he wrote the rest of the City of Angels tracks as well. The song's lyrics, delivered over a disco beat, compare a lover to an electronic device such as a computer or a robot. The seven-minute song was split into two parts for its release as a single, with "Part 1" receiving most notoriety.

"Love Machine" was the only two-part single of the Miracles' career.

"Love Machine"  was a multi-million selling Platinum single, and a number-one smash hit on the U.S. Billboard Hot 100, the best-selling single of the Miracles' career, having sold over 4.5 million copies. The single went to #5 on the Hot Soul Singles chart, and went to #20 on Record World'''s National Disco file Top 20 chart. It was also a Top 10 hit in the UK, peaking at number three on the UK Singles Chart.

Personnel
 Lead vocals by Billy Griffin
 Background vocals by Bobby Rogers, Ronnie White and Pete Moore
 Growling by Bobby Rogers
 "Yeah, baby" vocals by Ronnie White
 Instrumentation by various Los Angeles studio musicians

Chart positions

{| class="wikitable sortable"
!Chart (1975-1976)
!Peakposition
|-
|Australia (Kent Music Report)
| style="text-align:center;"|89
|-
|U.S. Billboard Hot 100
| style="text-align:center;"|1
|-
|U.S. Record World" National Disco File
| style="text-align:center;"|20
|-
|UK Singles Chart
| style="text-align:center;"|3
|-
|U.S. Billboard Hot Black Singles
| style="text-align:center;"|5
|}

All-time charts

"Love Machine", to which Griffin and co-writer Miracle Pete Moore retained publishing rights through their publishing company Grimora Music (instead of Motown's music publishing company, Jobete), is the most-used song in Motown history and has generated more than $15 million in revenues.

Use in media

The term "love machine" was popularized in 1969 by Jacqueline Susann's best-selling novel of the same title.

The Miracles' "Love Machine" has since been used in many different commercials, motion pictures and television shows, including:

 Jesse Katsopolis and friends sang the song in the 1988 episode of the ABC TV series Full House episode, "The Seven-Month Itch" (Part 2)
 The first 30 seconds of the song was featured in a couple of Denny's restaurant television commercials in the 1980s, depicting a mother hen and her chicks dancing to this tune for their Grand Slam Breakfasts.
 The 1995 Disney film Heavyweights
 The 1997 crime film Donnie Brasco
 The 1998 disco film 54
 The 2000 film Coyote Ugly, the scene of the wedding of Violet's friend (played by Melanie Lynskey).
 The 2002 film The New Guy
 Around 2004, the hotel chain Travelodge started to use the song with the brand's mascot bear dancing.
 The movie trailer for the 2000 animated film Chicken Run
 The TV spot for the 2001 Pixar film Monsters, Inc.
 A new version of the song also appears in the 2013 Disney film, Planes, where the Mexican airplane El Chupacabra attempts to impress the Canadian Rochelle with it. His use of the original version fails, but when he changes it to a slow serenade, it works.
 The 1999 episode of Ally McBeal, "Love's Illusions".
 The 2001 episode of Futurama, "I Dated a Robot".
 The 2002 episode of My Wife and Kids, "Jr.'s Dating Dilemma".
 "Love Machine" was the name of a sentient computer virus in the 2009 film Summer Wars
 The chorus of the song was used in the Friends episode "The One Where Paul's the Man"

See also 
 List of Billboard Hot 100 number-one singles of 1976

References

External links
 See The MIRACLES perform "Love Machine" LIVE on YouTube

Billboard Hot 100 number-one singles
Cashbox number-one singles
1975 singles
The Miracles songs
Thelma Houston songs
Disco songs
Motown singles
Tamla Records singles
Songs written by Warren "Pete" Moore
Songs written by Billy Griffin
Song recordings produced by Freddie Perren
1975 songs
Wham! songs